Historia de amor is the first compilation album of the duet of contemporary Christian music Tercer Cielo. The album was released in 2009 of independent form. The compilation contains songs from all the studio albums of the duet published from 2000 until 2008: En ti (2000), Tercer Cielo (2002), Ahora tengo más (2005), Llueve (2007) and Hollywood (2008).

Track listing

Credits 
 Juan Carlos Rodríguez: Producer, composer, recording, music, voice.
 Evelyn Herrera: Voice.
 Marcos Yaroide: Composer, voice.
 Lilly Goodman: Voice, artist invited
 Joseph García: Producer, recording.
 Snider Espinoza: Producer, recording.

References 

2009 greatest hits albums
Spanish-language compilation albums
Tercer Cielo compilation albums